Charles William Mills, 2nd Baron Hillingdon (26 January 1855 – 6 April 1919) was a British banker and Conservative politician who sat in the House of Commons from 1885 to 1892, speaking once, in 1889.

Mills was eldest son of Charles Mills, 1st Baron Hillingdon and Lady Louisa Isabella (d.1918), daughter of Henry Lascelles, 3rd Earl of Harewood. He was a lieutenant in the Queen's Own West Kent Yeomanry and a partner in the banking firm of Glyn, Mills & Co.

In the 1885 general election, Mills was elected as member of parliament (MP) for the inceptive safe seat of Sevenoaks in which he owned The Wildernesse, setting up community allotments and an orphanage there.  He stood down from the Commons at the 1892 general election. In 1898 he inherited the title Baron Hillingdon and Hillingdon Court outright.

In the same year Hillingdon commissioned Edwin Lutyens, who was then working locally, to design Overstrand Hall. Its work began in 1899 and it was completed by 1901. Nikolaus Pevsner considered it one of Lutyens' most remarkable buildings, but other critics of the day thought it "lacked the picturesqueness of his best works".

Lord Hillingdon was elected a Fellow of the Royal Statistical Society in March 1900.

Hillingdon was godfather to Harry Elkins Widener, son of George Dunton Widener who both perished on the Titanic

He died in April 1919, aged 64, and was succeeded in the barony by his second son Arthur, the MP for Uxbridge, elected unopposed to replace his elder brother. Charles Thomas Mills was killed on the Western Front in France in 1915.  

Hillingdon married Alice Marion Harbord, daughter of Charles Harbord, 5th Baron Suffield, in 1886. They were given Overstrand Hall as a wedding present.

Arms

References

External links 
 
 

1855 births
1919 deaths
Barons in the Peerage of the United Kingdom
British bankers
Conservative Party (UK) MPs for English constituencies
Queen's Own West Kent Yeomanry officers
UK MPs 1885–1886
UK MPs 1886–1892
Hillingdon, B2
19th-century British businesspeople